Ținutul Argeș (or Ținutul Bucegi) was one of the ten Romanian ținuturi ("lands") founded in 1938, after King Carol II initiated an institutional reform by modifying the 1923 Constitution and the law of territorial administration. Named after the Argeș River and extending over historical areas of Wallachia and parts of Transylvania (Székely Land), it had its capital in the city of Bucharest. Ținutul Argeș ceased to exist following the territorial losses of Romania (Second Vienna Award) and the king's abdication in 1940.

Coat of arms
The coat of arms consisted of ten bars, five of azure and five of argent, representing the former ten counties (județe) of Greater Romania (71 in total in 1938) included in it, charged with or eagle wings displayed facing dexter with an or Latin cross in the beak (elements taken from Wallachia's historical coat of arms) standing over five peaks argent representing the Bucegi Mountains.

Former counties incorporated
After the 1938 Administrative and Constitutional Reform, the older 71 counties lost their authority; of those, 10 were incorporated in Ținutul Argeș.

 Argeș County
 Brașov County
 Buzău County
 Dâmbovița County
 Ilfov County
 Muscel County
 Prahova County
 Teleorman County
 Trei Scaune County
 Vlașca County

See also
 Historical administrative divisions of Romania
 Sud (development region)
 History of Romania

External links
 Map

Arges
Arges
Wallachia
1938 establishments in Romania
1940 disestablishments in Romania
States and territories established in 1938
States and territories disestablished in 1940